Raúl Angelo Pórcel González (November 6, 1954, Sucre) is a Bolivian politician and journalist. Pórcel González was a member of the Potosí Regional Committee of the Christian Democratic Party (PDC) between 1977 and 1980. He was the executive secretary of the University Workers Trade Union at the UTF between 1978 and 1980, after which he served as the executive secretary of the Bank Employees Federation of Potosí between 1982 and 1993. In the bank employees trade union movement, he was the conflict secretary of the Bank Workers Confederation of Bolivia between 1983 and 1985.

Pórcel González became a member of the Political Committee of the Revolutionary Left Movement (MIR) in 1996. Between 1996 and 1997 he served as a municipal council member in Potosí. In 1997 he was elected to the Chamber of Deputies, as the MIR candidate in the single-member constituency No. 38 (which covers areas of the Tomás Frías province). His alternate was Edwin Rodríguez Espejo. He contested the 2002 parliamentary election as well as a MIR candidate in constituency No. 38.

References

1954 births
Bolivian trade union leaders
Bolivian journalists
Male journalists
Living people
Christian Democratic Party (Bolivia) politicians
Revolutionary Left Movement (Bolivia) politicians
Members of the Chamber of Deputies (Bolivia)